Daphne mezereum, commonly known as mezereum, mezereon,  February daphne, spurge laurel or spurge olive, is a species of Daphne in the flowering plant family Thymelaeaceae, native to most of Europe and Western Asia, north to northern Scandinavia and Russia. In southern Europe it is confined to medium to higher elevations and in the subalpine vegetation zone, but descends to near sea level in northern Europe. It is generally confined to soils derived from limestone.

Description
It is a deciduous shrub growing to 1.5 m tall. The leaves are soft, 3–8 cm long and 1–2 cm broad, arranged spirally on the stems. The flowers are produced in early spring on the bare stems before the leaves appear. They have a four-lobed pink or light purple (rarely white) perianth 10–15 mm diameter, and are strongly scented. The fruit is a bright red berry 7–12 mm diameter; it is very poisonous for humans, though fruit-eating birds like thrushes are immune and eat them, dispersing the seeds in their droppings.

Toxicity
Daphne mezereum is very toxic because of the compounds mezerein and daphnin present especially in the berries and twigs. If poisoned, victims experience a choking sensation. Handling the fresh twigs can cause rashes and eczema in sensitive individuals. Despite this, it is commonly grown as an ornamental plant in gardens for its attractive flowers.  The native wild version became a protected species in the UK in 1975 under the Conservation of Wild Creatures and Wild Plants Act.

Symptoms of poisoning
Ingestion of plant parts leads within a few hours to severe irritation and a burning sensation in the mouth, with swelling of the lips and face, increased salivation, hoarseness and difficulty in swallowing. These symptoms are soon followed by severe abdominal pain, headache, numbness, nausea and bloody diarrhoea. Children (who may be poisoned by the attractive red fruits) often show additional narcotic symptoms with muscular twitching. Work by Frohne and Pfänder has determined that it is the chewed seed, not the fruit pulp, that is responsible for the severe symptoms in poisoning by the berries.

1955 Case study involving consumption of flowers
A seven year old boy, who was admitted to hospital (Department of Pediatrics, University Hospital Heidelberg) after consuming several flowers of D. mezereum (number unspecified) at first exhibited symptoms very similar to acute appendicitis, with headache and abdominal pain.<blockquote>...a number of neurologically and psychically striking symptoms developed in the hours that followed: periods of complete disorientation and very severe motor unrest alternated with periods of complete clarity, with tetanoid fearfulness. Towards evening, signs of meningitis and finally generalised convulsions appeared. Very severe diarrhoea then heralded serious enteritis which only subsided after a week.<ref>Nöller, H.G. 'Ein Seidelbastintoxikation beim Kinde' Monatschr. Kinderheilk. 103, 327-330 (1955). (Translation: 'Poisoning of a child by Daphne mezereum' Monthly Bulletin of Paediatrics no. 103.)</ref></blockquote>

Gallery

Notes

References
 This article is based on a translation of an article from the German Wikipedia.
 Manfred A. Fischer: Exkursionsflora von Österreich, Stuttgart 1994, 
 Smeil, Fitschen: Flora von Deutschland'', Heidelberg, Wiesbaden.

External links

Mezereon Plant Information
 

mezereum
Alpine flora
Flora of Europe
Flora of Western Asia
Flora of Finland
Flora of Russia
Flora of Ukraine
Plants described in 1753
Taxa named by Carl Linnaeus